Irina Aleksandrovna Smelaya (born 21 December 1991), better known by her stage name Tatarka, is a female hip-hop artist from Tatarstan, Russia. Her songs are written in Tatar and English.

Music and vlogging
Smelaya was born in Naberezhnye Chelny. She currently lives in St. Petersburg and is a vlogger. Her YouTube blog named "Tatar Days" has almost a million subscribers.

"Altyn" ("gold" in Tatar) was her first song, which was launched in 2016 and praised her in the Russian music scene.

Smelaya is currently working on recording her debut album. It is known that the album will be in two languages, Tatar and English.

Personal life
Smelaya married Ilya Prusikin, the vocalist and frontman of the Russian pop-rave-band Little Big, on 6 July 2016.

She gave birth to her and Prusikin's son Dobrynya on 26 November 2017.

Smelaya and Prusikin publicly announced their separation on 21 August 2020.

Discography
Singles

Albums

Video Clips

Participations 

 2014 – Little Big – "Public Enemy"
 2016 – Little Big – "Big Dick"
 2016 – Little Big – "Hateful Love"
 2018 – Bread – "Shashlyndos" 
 2019 – Animal Jazz – "Feelings"

Watch also 
 Little Big (band)
 Ilya Prusikin
 The Hatters

References 

Russian musicians
Living people
1991 births
Tatar people
Tatar musicians
Russian people of Tatar descent
Tatar Christians